, also known as S.S.D.FANTASICA, is a freelancer composer. He has contributed music as a video game music composer for the Bemani division, but also video games published by Nintendo such as the Super Smash Bros. series, or developed by Chunsoft like the Pokémon crossover of the Mystery Dungeon franchise and the Kamaitachi no Yoru series.

Biography
Iiyoshi is currently working as a sound designer, including composing soundtracks and sound effects.

Early life
In the past, he was trained at Naomi Career Center in Japan. After graduating, he has worked with other companies, including D-MAC Records, before becoming a freelancer.

Works

BEMANI

Video Games

Albums
FANTASCAPE - Act.1 (2010)
ETHNOPLEX (2020)

Footnotes

Notes

References

External links
Arata Iiyoshi on RemyWiki.

Japanese composers
Japanese male composers
Living people
Video game composers
Year of birth missing (living people)